Cecil Heydenrych (born 11 January 1959) is a South African cricketer. He played in four first-class and four List A matches for Boland from 1987/88 to 1989/90.

See also
 List of Boland representative cricketers

References

External links
 

1959 births
Living people
South African cricketers
Boland cricketers
People from Standerton